Vladimir Medar (1923–1978) was a Croatian film and television actor. He played the title role in the 1962 Italian adventure film Taras Bulba, the Cossack.

Selected filmography

 Barba Zvane (1949) - Stipe ... partijac
 Jezero (1950)
 Bakonja fra Brne (1951) - Krsto
 The Gypsy Girl (1953)
 Esalon doktora M. (1955) - Saban
 Michel Strogoff (1956) - Aubergiste (uncredited)
 Poslednji kolosek (1956) - Masinovodja Djordje
 Cipelice na asfaltu (1956) - (segment "Gvozdeni orao")
 Potrazi Vandu Kos (1957) - Samac (uncredited)
 La Tour, prends garde ! (1958)
 Miss Stone (1958) - Golemiot Vezir
 Gospodja ministarka (1958)
 Tri Ane (1959) - Recepcioner hotela 'Istra' II
 Dilizansa snova (1960) - Gost u kafani (uncredited)
 Ljubav i moda (1960) - Modni krojac II
 Zajednicki stan (1960) - Dragisa
 Prvi gradjanin male varosi (1961) - Predsednik druge opstine
 Solimano il conquistatore (1961) - Il Fabbro
 Taras Bulba, the Cossack (1962) - Taras Bulba
 Treasure of the Silver Lake (1962) - Saloon-Wirt (uncredited)
  (1962) - Der Kramer Krummhändl
 Nevesinjska puska (1963) - Kapetan Tomas
 Le fils de Tarass Boulba (1964) - Boulba
 Grand Canyon Massacre (1964) - Harley Whitmore
 Freddy in the Wild West (1964) - Murdock, Perkins Henchman
 Among Vultures (1964) - Baker Sr. (uncredited)
 Fire Over Rome (1965) - Nero
 Old Surehand (1965) - Ben O'Brian
 Count Bobby, The Terror of The Wild West (1966) - Doc Ted W. Harper
 Do pobedata i po nea (1966) - Kmetot
 Winnetou and Old Firehand (1966) - Caleb
 In the Shadow of the Eagles (1966) - Magdo
  (1967) - Bürgermeister
 The Blood Demon (1967) - Pater Fabian
 Day of Anger (1967) - Old Man Perkins (uncredited)
 Massacre in the Black Forest (1967)
 The Belle Starr Story (1968) - John Shelley
  (1968) - Alecos
 Schamlos (1968) -  Guido Romanelli
 The Valley of Death (1968) - Sheriff
 La porta del cannone (1969)
 Love and Some Swear Words (1969) - Leo Karpati
 The Way to Paradise (1970) - Ljekarnik
 Fiddler on the Roof (1971) - Priest
 The Bloody Vultures of Alaska (1973) - Hotelist (uncredited)
 Anno Domini 1573 (1975) - Kovac
 The Rat Savior (1976) - Kupac knjiga
 Crazy Days (1977) - Profesor
 Operation Stadium (1977) - Magistar / Apotekar
 The Last Mission of Demolitions Man Cloud (1978) - Covjek sa stapom
 The Man to Destroy (1979) - Vijecnik u paklu

References

Bibliography
 Roy Kinnard & Tony Crnkovich. Italian Sword and Sandal Films, 1908–1990. McFarland, 2017.

External links

1923 births
1978 deaths
Croatian male stage actors
Croatian male film actors
Male actors from Zagreb
Yugoslav male actors